Kite is a surname. Notable people with the surname include:

 Bertram Kite (1857–1939), Dean of Hobart
 Brent Kite, Australian Rugby League player
 Fred Kite (1921–1993), highly decorated British soldier in World War II
 Greg Kite (born 1961), American former basketball player
 Harold Kite (1921–1965), NASCAR driver
 Jimmy Kite (born 1976), American race car driver
 John Kite, 16th century clergyman
 Jonathan Kite, American actor and impressionist
 Lucy Kite (born 1977), British TV presenter
 Marylin S. Kite (born 1947), a justice of the Wyoming Supreme Court
 Melissa Kite, British journalist
 Phil Kite (born 1962), English football goalkeeper
 Robert Kite, Lord Mayor of London in 1766
 Ross Kite, Australian rugby league footballer
 Sione Kite (born 1988), Australian rugby player
 Tom Kite, American golfer
 William Kite, Victorian showman made famous in the song "Being for the Benefit of Mr. Kite!" by the Beatles

Fictional characters
 Fred Kite, bolshie shop steward played by Peter Sellers in the British comedy film I'm All Right Jack